The 1913 Oregon Webfoots football team represented the University of Oregon in the 1913 college football season. Hugo Bezdek returned to coach the team. Under his coaching in 1906, the team posted a 5–0–1 record, but he left at the end of that season. Returning in 1913, "he stayed five seasons and took Oregon to new heights."

Schedule

References

Oregon
Oregon Ducks football seasons
Oregon Webfoots football